Powdermill Run is a  long 2nd order tributary to French Creek in Venango County, Pennsylvania, Crawford and Mercer Counties, Pennsylvania.

Course
Powdermill Run rises on the Warden Run divide about 3 miles northwest of Hannasville, Pennsylvania in Venango County.  Powdermill Run then flows southwest through Crawford County into Mercer County to meet French Creek at Carlton, Pennsylvania.

Watershed
Powdermill Run drains  of area, receives about 43.7 in/year of precipitation, has a topographic wetness index of 426.12, and has an average water temperature of 8.17 °C.  The watershed is 39% forested.

See also 
 List of rivers of Pennsylvania
 List of tributaries of the Allegheny River

Additional Images

References

Rivers of Crawford County, Pennsylvania
Rivers of Mercer County, Pennsylvania
Rivers of Venango County, Pennsylvania
Rivers of Pennsylvania
Tributaries of the Allegheny River